A workshop is a room or building which provides both the area and tools required for the manufacture or repair of manufactured  goods.

Workshop may also refer to:

Brief, collaborative, creative activity
Charrette, an intense period of design or planning activity
Writing circle, a gathering of writers for critique and inspiration
Training workshop
Organization workshop
Acting workshop
an academic workshop, a smaller version of an academic conference
a meeting in which groups apply methods for creative problem-solving

Arts and entertainment
Steam Workshop, a popular Steam exclusive modding and sharing tool
The Workshop (film), 2017 French film
The Workshop (play), a 2017 Off-Broadway play
"The Workshop" (Smash), an episode of Smash
"Workshop" (The Beach Boys song)
Workshop (web series), a video series focusing on struggling actors' lives
Workshop Jazz Records, Motown's jazz subsidiary, active from 1962 to 1964
Workshop production, a type of theatre performance
Workshop of the Telescopes, an album by Blue Oyster Cult

Other uses
Workshop (juggling)
Workshop system, a means of subcontracting piecework to small scale craft operations, such as blacksmiths

See also
Sheltered workshop, an organization or environment that employs people with disabilities separately from others
Automobile repair shop